Westmoreland is a town in Sumner County, Tennessee, and is bordering southern Kentucky. The population was 2,093 at the 2000 census and 2,206 at the 2010 census. The town name was inspired by a wealthy lumberman from North Carolina, sharing the same name.

History 

Westmoreland has a few interesting things through its history. Including having been an old railroad town and containing one of the smallest railroad tunnels there is.

Originally created in 1901 by a state charter, the town was officially incorporated to the State of Tennessee in February of 1901. In the years that followed, it slowly grew to the albeit small population it had today.

In the early 2000's, the Westmoreland Elementary school shut down, and relocated to a school closer to the Middle and High schools. The building today stands as Westmoreland Dream Center, and is a hub for can food drives and some boy scout activities.

The town has the smallest railroad tunnel in the world, smaller than the average American living room. It was built sometime during the early to mid 1900s and today is known as Little Tunnel. A mural in Town Square depicts the tunnel, along with a few other notable buildings and places.

Geography 

Demographics

2020 census

As of the 2020 United States census, there were 2,718 people, 990 households, and 646 families residing in the town.

2000 census
As of the census of 2000, there were 2,093 people, 804 households, and 561 families residing in the town. The population density was 547.5 people per square mile (211.5/km2). There were 874 housing units at an average density of 228.6 per square mile (88.3/km2). The racial makeup of the town was 98.85% White, 0.55% African American, 0.24% Native American, 0.05% Asian, 0.05% Pacific Islander, 0.29% from other races, and 0.48% from two or more races. Hispanic or Latino of any race were 0.13% of the population.

There were 804 households, out of which 34.7% had children under the age of 18 living with them, 54.4% were married couples living together, 11.3% had a female householder with no husband present, and 30.2% were non-families. 27.1% of all households were made up of individuals, and 14.6% had someone living alone who was 65 years of age or older. The average household size was 2.48 and the average family size was 3.01.

In the town, the population was spread out, with 25.3% under the age of 18, 8.3% from 18 to 24, 26.9% from 25 to 44, 22.5% from 45 to 64, and 17.0% who were 65 years of age or older. The median age was 36 years. For every 100 females, there were 80.6 males. For every 100 females age 18 and over, there were 77.4 males.

The median income for a household in the town was $28,958, and the median income for a family was $36,944. Males had a median income of $25,795 versus $19,366 for females. The per capita income for the town was $13,185. About 8.7% of families and 13.2% of the population were below the poverty line, including 13.7% of those under age 18 and 17.6% of those age 65 or over.

Gallery

References

External links
 Town website

Towns in Sumner County, Tennessee
Towns in Tennessee
Cities in Nashville metropolitan area